Sandra Martin is the author of the highly read Breaking the "Sound" Barrier to Fluent Reading, a curricular reading/spelling intervention designed to reach the at-risk learner. Sandra has been a teacher and curriculum developer for 38 years in the Conewago Valley School District and for Dickinson College, PA and is a guest writer for the Teachthought educational community. Sandra's three Breaking the "Sound" Barrier books have been a part of university-backed research that demonstrated their positive role as reading/spelling interventions in the classroom. Sandy also authored Mathopedia Levels 1 and 2, mathematical encyclopedias that assist students with the basics of mathematics.

Academic credentials
Bachelor of Science in Special Education, Bloomsburg University, PA.

Master of Education in Learning Disabilities, Shippensburg University, PA.

Published works
Books
Breaking the "Sound" Barrier to Fluent Reading (BSB), Level 1 (Specialty Educational Publishers, March 2002, Updated 2014)
Mathopedia, Level 1 (Chapter) ((Specialty Educational Publishers, 2003)
Mathopedia, Level 2 (Chapter) ((Specialty Educational Publishers, 2003)
Breaking the "Sound" Barrier to Fluent Reading (BSB), Level 2 (Specialty Educational Publishers, 2008)
Breaking the Sound Barrier to Fluent Reading, Level 3 (Specialty Educational Publishers, 2008)
Articles

Breaking the Sound Barrier to Fluent Reading (Keystone Leader, 1998)
The Increasingly Dated Image of the Slacker Teacher (Teachthought, 2014)

References 

Living people
American educators
American non-fiction writers
American women non-fiction writers
Year of birth missing (living people)
21st-century American women